Hugo Adalberto Velázquez Moreno (born 3 July 1966) is a Paraguayan politician. He is a former Deputy of the Congress of Paraguay, and he served the President of the Chamber of Deputies from 2014 to 2017. Velázquez was elected Vice President in the 2018 general elections.

In June 2022, he registered his candidacy for president in the 2023 Paraguayan general election. However, on 12 August 2022, Velázquez was designated as "significantly corrupt" by the United States Department of State, who accused him of offering a US$1 million bribe to obstruct an investigation involving him, along with an associate, Juan Carlos Duarte, legal counsel for the Yacyretá Dam, and both men had their visa revoked. As a result, Velázquez announced he was dropping his presidential candidacy, effective immediately, and his resignation as Vice President, effective the following week. However, the following week, Velázquez stated that he would not resign from the vice presidency, stating that there were no investigations for corruption against him in Paraguay. On 26 January 2023, the United States announced further sanctions against Velázquez, prohibiting him to do business with U.S. companies or have access to U.S. banks under the Magnitsky Act.

References

External links
 Official deputy website

Living people
1966 births
Colorado Party (Paraguay) politicians
Vice presidents of Paraguay
Presidents of the Chamber of Deputies of Paraguay
21st-century Paraguayan politicians